Paich is a surname. Notable people with the surname include:

 David Paich (born 1954), American musician, singer, songwriter, and record producer
 Marty Paich (1925–1995), American pianist

See also
 Paige (name)
 Pich